The Sanremo Music Festival 1981 was the 31st annual Sanremo Music Festival, held at the Teatro Ariston in Sanremo, province of Imperia between 5 and 7 February 1981 and broadcast by Rai 1.

The show was hosted by  Claudio Cecchetto, assisted by the actress Eleonora Vallone and by the singer Nilla Pizzi (two times winner of the Festival).

The winner of the Festival was Alice with the song "Per Elisa".

This was the first edition to be entirely broadcast on RAI, after eight years in which the live broadcast was restricted only to the final night of the festival.

Massimo Troisi should have participated in the final night of the festival with three segments as a comedian, but just before he took the stage, he decided not to appear because of the cuts to his monologues that were required by RAI executives.

Participants and results

Guests

References 

Sanremo Music Festival by year
1981 in Italian music
1981 music festivals